Alkham, Lydden and Swingfield Woods is a  biological Site of Special Scientific Interest north-west of Dover in Kent. Alkham Valley Woods is a Nature Conservation Review site, Grade I. 

This site is composed of several steeply sloping woods on chalk soil, together with an area of chalk grassland. The ground flora is diverse, including some unusual plants such as lady orchid in the woods and burnt orchid in the meadow.

Public footpaths go through some of the woods but other areas are private land.

References

Sites of Special Scientific Interest in Kent
Nature Conservation Review sites
Forests and woodlands of Kent